Juan Lorenzo Garibaldi (1893 – 5 August 1970) was an Argentine footballer. He was capped by the Argentina national team in 1912, playing against Uruguay in a 2–0 win. He played club football for Boca Juniors.

Career statistics

International

References

1893 births
1970 deaths
Argentine footballers
Argentina international footballers
Association football defenders
Boca Juniors footballers